The Ghost Hunter is a general name for a series of novels by Ivan Jones about a Victorian shoe-shine boy who has become a ghost. The boy, called William Povey, is trying to escape from the evil and obsessive Ghost Hunter, Mrs Croker. Her intention is to bottle all ghosts and eventually to use their spectral energy to make herself immortal.

The Ghost Hunter series
 The Ghost Hunter (1998) (Scholastic) 
 (Kindle 2012)Kindle edition : https://www.amazon.co.uk/The-Ghost-Hunter-ebook/dp/B009P59FQG/ref=sr_1_2?ie=UTF8&qid=1350732974&sr=8-2
 The Ghost Hunter at Chillwood Castle (2000) (Scholastic)
 The Ghost Hunter's House of Horror (2001) (Scholastic)

Plot summaries

The Ghost Hunter
In the first book, William Povey, a boy ghost from Victorian times, appears in Roddy's bedroom in the dead of night and frightens the wits out of him. William explains that he is being chased by a GHOST HUNTER and he needs help. After his initial fears and shock, Roddy decides to try to help his new friend. Apart from anything else, the ghost has some exciting abilities, such as passing through walls and flying, which Roddy is also able to do, thanks to the shoe-brushes which William lends him. 

William does not yet know who the Ghost Hunter is, but what he does know is that it captures ghosts like himself and shoves them into a bottle where they are trapped for all time. It becomes Roddy's - and later his sister, Tessa's - job to help William escape the clutches of the Ghost Hunter.

The Ghost Hunter at Chillwood Castle
In the second novel, the Ghost Hunter, re-appears. She is decidedly more dangerous and plans to capture dozens of ghosts at the AGM - THE ANNUAL GHOST MEETING. This takes place at Chillwood Castle. Roddy and Tessa do all in their power to stop her.

The Ghost Hunter's House of Horror
The third book, moves the action to a more sinister level where Mrs Croker, presumed dead, returns to her old decaying house somewhere in London. She is now more powerful than ever and has created a machine called a SPECKTRIKA, which by using spectral energy from captured ghosts will free her of time itself. Her ambition is to live forever and capture all the ghosts she can. But her assistant, De-Sniff, causes an accident to happen and both he and The GHOST HUNTER are swept down a TIME PORTAL to Victorian England. There, at least for now, they are stuck. Will they ever return?

Television adaption
In 2000, 2001 and 2002, the novels were adapted into The Ghost Hunter television series, a live-action drama, for the BBC and also the children's channel CBBC. There were three separate series, each of six half-hour episodes  The BBC television series was a major success, achieving the number one rating in the Radio Times poll of favourite children's programmes, coming ahead of Blue Peter, Grange Hill and a host of other programmes of the time. Viewing figures were very high. 

The writers for the series were Ivan Jones, author of the books, Jim Eldridge and Roy Apps. The director was David Bell.

Novel series
British horror novels